Ratkovce is a village and municipality in Hlohovec District in the Trnava Region of western Slovakia.

History
In historical records the village was first mentioned in 1113.

Geography
The municipality lies at an altitude of 165 metres and covers an area of 5.799km². It has a population of about 304 people.

References

External links
 
 
http://www.statistics.sk/mosmis/eng/run.html

Villages and municipalities in Hlohovec District